Benjamin Cross (September 15, 1786 – March 1, 1857), was a conductor, singer, organist, and one of the first American composers.

Cross was born in Philadelphia, Pennsylvania. His teachers included Benjamin Carr and Raynor Taylor. Benjamin Cross was one of the founding members of The Musical Fund Society as well as being one of its first directors.  Benjamin Cross was father to Michael H. Cross (1833-1897) who became a notable conductor in Philadelphia.

List of works
Strike the Harp in Praise of God - treble solo & chorus 
A Mother's Love - arranged for the piano forte

References

1786 births
1857 deaths
American male composers
American composers
19th-century American male musicians